Stefan Nystrand (born 20 October 1981 in Haninge) is a freestyle swimmer from Sweden.

Biography
His father Sture Nystrand is a Swede and his mother Smiljana Kokeza is a Croat from Split.

Nystrand, a short course (25 m) specialist, has won five individual medals in the FINA Short Course World Championships, and captured his first medal (silver) in long course (50 m) in the 100 m freestyle at the 2006 European Aquatics Championships in Budapest, behind Filippo Magnini of Italy. The following year he won a bronze medal at the 2007 World Aquatics Championships in Melbourne at the 50 m freestyle, with a new national record of 21.97.

After breaking the 48 second barrier in the 100 m freestyle long course (he was only the second person to do so after then world record holder Pieter van den Hoogenband) in Paris,  Nystrand revealed that he averages less than 3,000 meters a practice, a minuscule amount compared to other professional swimmers, and never more than 20,000 meters a week. He is also noted for having an atypical front crawl technique in which his arms do not bend during the recovery phase. Normally, a swimmer will bend the arm at the elbow while above water to improve their line in the water.

Nystrand has also competed at the Olympic Games, in 2000, 2004, 2008 and 2012.  His best placing at the Games is the fourth place he got at the 50 metre freestyle event, 0.06 seconds behind South African medallist Roland Schoeman. At the Berlin round of the 2007 FINA World Cup, Nystrand broke the 100 m freestyle and 50 m freestyle (both short course) world records.

Personal bests

Long course (50 m)

Short course (25 m)

Clubs 
 Södertörns SS (−2006)
 SK Neptun (2006–2011)
 Spårvägens SF (2011–)

See also 
 World record progression 50 metres freestyle
 World record progression 100 metres freestyle

References

External links
 

Swedish male breaststroke swimmers
Swedish male butterfly swimmers
Swedish male medley swimmers
Swimmers at the 2000 Summer Olympics
Swimmers at the 2004 Summer Olympics
Swimmers at the 2008 Summer Olympics
Swimmers at the 2012 Summer Olympics
Olympic swimmers of Sweden
World record setters in swimming
Swedish male freestyle swimmers
World Aquatics Championships medalists in swimming
Medalists at the FINA World Swimming Championships (25 m)
European Aquatics Championships medalists in swimming
1981 births
Living people
Södertörns SS swimmers
SK Neptun swimmers
Spårvägens SF swimmers
Swedish people of Croatian descent